ZhenFund is a Beijing-based venture capital firm founded in 2011 by New Oriental co-founders Bob Xu and Victor Wang. It is considered one of the largest Angel investors in China.

Background 
In 2011, Bob Xu and Victor Wang established ZhenFund in collaboration with Sequoia Capital China. Bob and Victor previously co-founded New Oriental, one of the largest education conglomerates in China.

The firm invests in early stage ventures, seed stages, series A, series B, and series C rounds. 

It invests in various industry fields such as the internet, technology, artificial intelligence, corporate services, healthcare and education.

ZhenFund is headquartered in Beijing with additional offices in Shanghai, Shenzhen and Palo Alto.

Notable investments 

 Blueseed
 EHang
 Jiayuan.com
 LightInTheBox
 Mobvoi
 Momenta
 Niu Technologies
 Ofo
 Ucommune
 Woyingzhichang
 VIPKid
 Xiaohongshu

References

External links
 www.zhenfund.com (Company Website)

Financial services companies established in 2011
Venture capital firms of China
Angel investors